Jennifer Song (born December 20, 1989) is a professional golfer currently playing on the LPGA Tour. In 2009, she won both the U.S. Women's Amateur Public Links and the U.S. Women's Amateur. She was only the fourth player in history to win both championships and the second player to win both in the same year.

Childhood and family life
Song was born in Ann Arbor, Michigan while her father was a graduate student at the University of Michigan. She was raised in South Korea and holds dual Korean and United States citizenship. While in Korea, she attended Taejon Christian International School, Daejeon, Korea, where she excelled as a student-athlete and was a striker on the school's girls' soccer team. She was among the top goal scorers in the KAIAC Conference during her sophomore year.

Amateur career
While growing up in South Korea, Song played golf on the Korea National Team. In 2007, she tied for low amateur at the U.S. Women's Open and was the quarterfinalist at the U.S. Women's Amateur.  In 2008, she again qualified for the U.S. Women's Open and U.S. Women's Amateur.

Beginning in 2008, she was a member of the golf team at the University of Southern California. During her freshman year at USC in 2008-2009, Song had eight top-ten finishes in ten starts and finished the season as the number three ranked player in the country. She was named Freshman of the Year, All-American, All-Pac-10 Freshman of the Year and All-Pac-10. She also set the all-time single-season stroke average record.  In the summer of 2009, Song finished low amateur at T13 in the U.S. Women's Open, and won both the U.S. Women's Amateur Public Links and the U.S. Women's Amateur.

In her sophomore year, she was again named All-American after tying for fifth at the NCAA Championships and leading USC to within a stroke of first place. She was voted Pac-10 Golfer of the Year, and was the third-ranked golfer in the country for the second year in a row. She finished her college career with a scoring average of 71.59, as well as her 15 career rounds in the 60s, all of which set USC school records. In October 2009, she accepted a sponsor's exemption to the LPGA Hana Bank Championship where she finished in 65th place out of 71 players. In April 2010, she qualified for the Kraft Nabisco Championship, one of four majors on the LPGA Tour. She finished tied for 21st place and was the low amateur at the tournament.

She finished her amateur career by representing the United States on the winning 2010 Curtis Cup team.

Professional career
Song turned professional immediately following the 2010 Curtis Cup Match, which concluded on June 13, 2010. She began playing full-time on the Duramed Futures Tour, of which she had been a member since June 2009, qualifying while still an amateur.  She won her first event as a professional, the 2010 Tate & Lyle Players Championship, the sole major tournament on the Futures Tour. She won again in 2010 on the Futures Tour at the Greater Richmond Golf Classic to move into fourth place on the 2010 Futures Tour money list after playing in only eight events.

She finished the 2010 season in second place on the Futures Tour money list which earned her full playing privileges on the LPGA Tour for 2011. She was also named Futures Tour Rookie of the Year.

In April 2018, Song finished as a runner-up at the ANA Inspiration, losing in a sudden-death playoff. In a playoff that included Pernilla Lindberg and Inbee Park, Song was eliminated on the third extra hole, when she could only make a par to the others' birdies. Previously, on the second extra hole, Song had a putt to win the championship, but missed to the right of the hole.

Professional wins (2)

Futures Tour wins (2)

Futures Tour major championship is shown in bold.

LPGA Tour playoff record (0–1)

Results in LPGA majors
Results not in chronological order before 2019.

^ The Evian Championship was added as a major in 2013.

LA = Low amateur
CUT = missed the half-way cut
NT = no tournament
T = tied

Summary

Most consecutive cuts made – 8 (2015 British Open – 2017 ANA)
Longest streak of top-10s – 2 (2017 Evian – 2018 ANA)

LPGA Tour career summary

1Not a member of the LPGA in this year. Scoring average and earnings not official.
Official as of the 2022 season

Team appearances
Amateur
Curtis Cup (representing the United States): 2010 (winners)

Curtis Cup record

References

External links

USC official biography (archived)

South Korean female golfers
American female golfers
USC Trojans women's golfers
LPGA Tour golfers
Winners of ladies' major amateur golf championships
Golfers from Michigan
Golfers from Orlando, Florida
American sportspeople of Korean descent
Sportspeople from Ann Arbor, Michigan
1989 births
Living people